NGC 315 is an elliptical galaxy in the constellation Pisces. It was discovered on September 11, 1784 by William Herschel.

References

External links
 

0315
00597
03455
17840911
Pisces (constellation)
Elliptical galaxies